The Donald and Barbara Zucker School of Medicine at Hofstra/Northwell is the graduate medical school of Hofstra University in the town of Hempstead on Long Island, in the U.S. state of New York. The academic institution was established in 2008 by Hofstra University and the North Shore-LIJ Hospital system which was rebranded as Northwell Health in 2015. The Zucker School of Medicine enrolls 99 students each year and offers an MD (doctor of medicine) and PhD (doctor of philosophy in the molecular basis of medicine). It also offers a joint MD—PhD degree; joint MD—MPH (Master of Public Health); joint MD—MBA (Master of Business Administration); and joint MD—OMS (oral and maxillofacial surgery). It also offers a dual-degree "4+4" program comprising an undergraduate degree (BA or BS) followed by automatic matriculation to the School of Medicine.

History
In October 2007, Hofstra University and Northwell Health (then known as North Shore-LIJ) announced plans to establish a new medical school: the first allopathic medical school in Nassau County, the first new medical school in the New York metropolitan area in more than 35 years, and the first in New York State since 1963. In March 2008, the parties executed a joint academic agreement establishing them as equal partners in launching the new school. In June 2010, the school was granted preliminary accreditation by the Liaison Committee on Medical Education (LCME), the accrediting body for U.S. medical education programs leading to the MD degree. Classes began in August 2011. In May 2015, the school's inaugural class graduated with 29 students; all received residencies to institutions across the U.S. Also in 2015, the school attained full accreditation.

In January 2016, the medical school changed its name from Hofstra North Shore-LIJ School of Medicine to Hofstra Northwell School of Medicine, reflecting the renaming of the health system to Northwell Health. In August 2017, after a $61 million donation to the school, it was renamed the Donald and Barbara Zucker School of Medicine at Hofstra/Northwell.

Education

In addition to the graduate degrees listed earlier, the Zucker School of Medicine offers graduate medical education (GME) and continuing medical education (CME). For students who have already earned a DDS or DMD degree, Zucker School of Medicine delivers the MD curriculum for a six-year medical degree integrated and certificate training pathway in oral and maxillofacial surgery (MD/OMS). Each year, the School of Medicine admits four MD/PhD students who, over seven to eight years, complete both the MD degree program requirements and the requirements for awarding of the PhD in the Molecular Basis of Medicine.

In March 2015, the Hofstra University and Northwell partnership announced the launch of Hofstra Northwell School of Graduate Nursing and Physician Assistant Studies, offering these Master of Science degrees. Hofstra's healthcare-professional education network also includes its School of Health Professions and Human Services.

Since its establishment, the school has consistently been recognized among the top medical schools nationwide for medical research as ranked by U.S. News & World Report. In 2019, it was ranked #72 in research and #85 in primary care.

Research is conducted by faculty and students at The Feinstein Institutes for Medical Research, Northwell's principal biomedical research facility. Approximately 70 percent of students engage in research during the summer after their first year of study, and nearly 100 percent do so by graduation. Additionally, research is performed by students and faculty at Cold Spring Harbor Laboratory, a strategic partner of Northwell.

Physical plant 
Zucker School of Medicine comprises two major buildings totaling a gross floor area of approximately 113,000 square feet. The East building is the original facility, with the West building an expansion completed in 2015.

Notable people 

 Yousef Al-Abed, Professor of Molecular Medicine
 Lance Becker, Professor of Emergency Medicine
 Peter B. Berger, Professor of Cardiology
 Joel Block, Clinical Assistant Professor of Psychiatry
 Barbara A. Cornblatt, Professor of Psychiatry
 Stephen Dolgin, Professor of Surgery
 Amos Grunebaum (born 1950), obstetrician and gynecologist
 David Langer, Professor of neurosurgery and radiology
 Thomas G. McGinn, Professor of Medicine
 Ira S. Nash, cardiologist and associate dean
 Leonid Poretsky, Professor of Medicine
 Jesse Roth, Clinical Professor of Molecular Medicine
 David B. Samadi, Professor of urology
 Kevin J. Tracey, Professor of Molecular Medicine

References

External links 

 

Hofstra University
Universities and colleges on Long Island
Universities and colleges in Nassau County, New York
Universities and colleges in New York City
Educational institutions established in 2008
2008 establishments in New York (state)
Medical schools in New York (state)
Northwell Health